Alejandro Glaría (born 25 August 1970) is an Argentine former professional footballer who played as a forward for clubs of Argentina, Chile and Mexico.

Career
 Kimberley 1988
 San Miguel 1989–1990
 Santiago Wanderers 1990–1991
 Universidad Católica 1992
 Alianza Lima 1992
 Coquimbo Unido 1993
 Cobreloa 1994–1996
 Banfield 1996–1998
 Pachuca 1998–2000
 Puebla 2000
 Pumas UNAM 2001
 Chiapas 2002
 Tapachula 2003
 Talleres de Còrdoba 2003

External links
 

1970 births
Living people
Argentine footballers
Association football forwards
Chilean Primera División players
Liga MX players
Club Atlético Banfield footballers
Talleres de Córdoba footballers
C.F. Pachuca players
Club Puebla players
Club Universidad Nacional footballers
Chiapas F.C. footballers
Santiago Wanderers footballers
Club Deportivo Universidad Católica footballers
Coquimbo Unido footballers
Cobreloa footballers
Argentine expatriate footballers
Argentine expatriate sportspeople in Chile
Expatriate footballers in Chile
Argentine expatriate sportspeople in Mexico
Expatriate footballers in Mexico